Lungar is a village in Satar Mese District, Manggarai Regency in East Nusa Tenggara Province. Its population was 1219, as of 2010.

Climate
Lungar has a borderline subtropical highland climate (Cfb) and tropical rainforest climate (Af). The coldest month averages 17.9 °C, only 0.1 °C short of the threshold for tropical climates. It has moderate rainfall from June to September and heavy to very heavy rainfall in the remaining months.

References

East Nusa Tenggara
Villages in Indonesia